The Sichuan leaf warbler (Phylloscopus forresti) is a species of leaf warbler found in central China.
Its natural habitats are subtropical or tropical moist lowland forests and heavily degraded former forest.

References

Sichuan leaf warbler
Birds of Central China
Sichuan leaf warbler
Taxonomy articles created by Polbot